Mendó is a Grammy Award winning album under the category Best Latin Pop Album by Alex Cuba.

References

Grammy Award-winning albums